Atez is a town and municipality located in the province and autonomous community of Navarre, northern Spain.

References

Municipalities in Navarre